Catholic canon may refer to:

 Canon law of the Catholic Church
 1983 Code of Canon Law
 1917 Code of Canon Law
 Code of Canons of the Eastern Churches
 The Catholic Bible, canon of the books of the of Bible held by the Catholic Church
 Canon (clergy)

See also 
 Canon (canon law)